Oslo Airport may refer to:

 Oslo Airport, Gardermoen, serving Oslo and Eastern Norway for domestic and international flights since 1998
 Oslo Airport, Fornebu, formerly serving Oslo for domestic and international flights from 1939 to 1998
 Gressholmen Airport, formerly serving Oslo for seaplane flights from 1927 to 1939
 Kjeller Airport, formerly serving Oslo for land flights from 1912 to 1939, currently in use for general aviation
 Moss Airport, Rygge, formerly serving Oslo and Eastern Norway mainly for international flights from 2008 to 2016
 Sandefjord Airport, Torp, serving Eastern Norway for international and domestic flights since 1957
 The Oslo Airport localization controversy, a major debate involving the placement of main airports serving Oslo.